Suzan Mutesi (born Suzan Faith Mutesi Mufumbiro; 21 June 1986) is a Ugandan-Australian actress, model and fashion designer. In 2022, she appeared in The Challenge: Australia, a reality television competition series which was hosted by presenter and sports commentator Brihony Dawson and premiered on Network 10. She was also called as "the African fashion icon that conquered Australian fashion".

Early life and education
Originally from Uganda, Mutesi moved to Australia to complete her high school at Delany College, Granville. She received a Bachelor of Design with a major in fashion at Raffles KvB Institute of Technology.

Career

Suzan Mutesi (born Suzan Faith Mutesi; 21 June 1986) is an African-Australian Actress, Influencer,  and author of the books Unapologetically Black and princess Anendha. In 2022,  a cast member on a reality TV show The challenge.  Played a DJ on a Netflix show Heart Break High.  Mutesi can also be seen in the Marvel film Shang-Chi and the Legend of the Ten Rings. In 2021, she had a role in the film Ruby's Choice as 'shopper 1', 2020 a movie named Moon Rock For Monday directed by Kurt Martin, 2019 TV series Deadly women, 2009  featured in the movie X men origin wolverine and also in 2015 featured in a movie irreversible choices. She's also known for winning the Fashion icon award at the African Australian Music and Movie award 2014. In the same year she also won the Abryanz award 2014 for the Best fashion contributor in the Diaspora in Uganda Africa. In 2012 she won Fashion Designer by Celebrate Africa Australians. She showcased at Fashion Aid Forward 2015 hosted by Channel Ten's Henry Roth with most of Melbourne's best designers and Project Runway winners in a theatrical circus Nocturne runway.

She had a role in the Movie Gossip Nation 2012, and was an extra in The Wolverine and The Australian working alongside Nicole, Kidman Wil.I.am and Hugh Jackman. Played an extra on the movie Truth working alongside Cate Blanchett and Dennis Quaid. Suzan also was a regular featured extra on channel 7 Australian series Headland (2005-2006) working alongside Rachael Taylor a Hollywood star who is known for her act in the movie Transformers. Suzan co-hosted with well-known African American Actor Pascal Atuma, Desmond Elliot and John Dumelo at the 2013 African Australian Music and Movie awards. She got the honors to represent an award to an international music artist Awilo Longomba. Suzan has featured in TV adverts on Australian television like Fox 8 summer AD in 2011; she also featured on an international Nicabate Ad 2013 up to 2014. She has also featured in music videos like Star Fire- by Scrim and Mr dread locks by and Latifa ft. LL Bock. Early 2014 she launched the Heart of Gold Africa organization which is involved in helping the less fortunate. The foundation is affiliated with "suzan Mutesi Fashion House" a designer label of African inspiration one can help by purchasing a dress as 10% of the money spent is given to the foundation. Heart of Gold Africa was formed to assist the rural people of Africa in attaining information to fight the digital age and advocate for their fundamental rights and improve their health and socio-economic status. The organization provides education and awareness using an integrated approach of communication.

References

External links

Australian fashion designers
Australian women fashion designers
1986 births
Living people
Ugandan fashion designers
Ugandan women fashion designers
Australian people of Ugandan descent
Ugandan emigrants to Australia
The Challenge (TV series) contestants